Sir Charles John Lowe KCMG (4 October 1880 – 20 March 1969) was an Australian judge. He served on the Supreme Court of Victoria from 1927 to 1964, the longest serving judge in the court's history. He presided over several major federal and state government inquiries.

Early life
Lowe was born on 4 October 1880 in Panmure, Victoria. His father was born in Lancashire, England, and worked as a schoolteacher until being pensioned off due to blindness. Lowe attended the University of Melbourne where he was the "model of the able poor student", graduating Bachelor of Arts in 1900, Master of Arts in 1902 and Bachelor of Laws in 1904. He was admitted to the Victorian Bar in 1905.

Judicial career
Lowe was appointed to the Supreme Court of Victoria in January 1927, with the encouragement of his friend Owen Dixon. He notably presided over the trial of the accused Pyjama Girl murderer in 1944 and the murder trial of John Bryan Kerr in 1951, where his decision was upheld on appeal to the Judicial Committee of the Privy Council. He also presided over "four major commissions of inquiry" – the 1940 inquiry into the Canberra air disaster, the 1942 inquiry into the Bombing of Darwin, the 1943 federal royal commission into Eddie Ward's "Brisbane Line" allegations, and the 1949–1950 Victorian royal commission into the Communist Party of Australia. In the latter, communist activist Ralph Gibson concluded that "contrary to our fears and to the Government's hopes, displayed a certain genuine interest in Communist theory and a certain respect for evidence".

Lowe retired from the court in 1964 after a record 37 years, presiding over his final trial in 1962.

Other activities
Lowe served as chancellor of the University of Melbourne from 1941 to 1954, in place of John Latham. He "spoke out for better conditions for professors, publicly supported research, international academic intercourse, 'liberal education', and co-residential colleges". He also served as president of the local English-Speaking Union and the Australian-Asian Association of Victoria.

References

1880 births
1969 deaths
Judges of the Supreme Court of Victoria
University of Melbourne alumni
Australian people of English descent
Chancellors of the University of Melbourne
Australian barristers
Australian Knights Commander of the Order of St Michael and St George